Alydus pilosulus is a species of broad-headed bug in the family Alydidae. It is found in North America and Oceania.

References

 Henry, Thomas J., and Richard C. Froeschner (1992). Corrections and additions to the "Catalog of the Heteroptera, or True Bugs, of Canada and the Continental United States". Proceedings of the Entomological Society of Washington, vol. 94, no. 2, 263–272.
 Nishida, Gordon M., ed. (1997). Hawaiian Terrestrial Arthropod Checklist, Third Edition, 263.
 Thomas J. Henry, Richard C. Froeschner. (1988). Catalog of the Heteroptera, True Bugs of Canada and the Continental United States. Brill Academic Publishers.

Further reading

 Arnett, Ross H. (2000). American Insects: A Handbook of the Insects of America North of Mexico. CRC Press.

Alydinae